Torstein Ellingsen (born 7 August 1966) is a Norwegian drummer and music producer, known from a series of album recordings.

Career 
Ellingsen was born in Oslo and started his career playing in his older brother's band The Royal Rakes Jazzband (1980), collaborated within Christiania Jazzband (1981), and was a part of "Caledonia Jazzband" (1982–1998), with The Real Thing (1995–1998 og 2010–2014), with Magnolia Jazzband (from 1999), and with his Danish wife and singer Majken Christiansen (from 2001). Ellingsen lead his own band The Sinatra Songbook (from 1999) along with jazz singer Ingar Kristiansen. He plays in these bands: Prima Vista Social Club, Rubber Soul Quartet and Gigaphonics. He has also recorded albums with Paul Wagnberg Trio, Rune Nicolaysen Trio, Anders Aarum Trio, Tor Einar Bekken, Sandvika Storband, Ola Kvernberg, Harald Bergersen, Anne Marte Slinning and Jan Werner. He has also collaborated with musicians like Sigurd Køhn, Georg Reiss, Norbert Susemihl, Halvdan Sivertsen and Øystein Sunde.

Ellingsen holds a master's degree in political science at the University of Oslo (1994) and diploma degree in Music Management from Det Jyske Musikkonservatorium in Århus, Denmark (2012). He was the host of the TV program "Bandbox" at NRK (1997), worked as a jazz writer and editor of the jazz magazine Jazznytt (2001–02). He also was a communications consultant in Rikskonsertene in Oslo (1998–2001) and was employed as a concert producer the same place until 2016 where he facilitates concerts for children and young audiences. Ellingsen has published the norwegian language book Rosinen i pølsa (Kagge, 2005) with Knut Lystad and Rune Semundseth.

Discography (in selection)

Solo albums 
2001: The Sinatra Songbook (Curling Legs)

Collaborations 
With Caledonia Jazzband
1985: Moods of New Orleans (Hot Club Records)
1987: Walkin''' (Hot Club Records), with Wendell Brunious
1991: Is You Or Is You Ain't (Hot Club Records), with Norbert Susemihl
1997: Creole Nights (Hot Club Records), with Geoff Bull

With Garden of Delight
1987: Big Wheels in Emotion (Pale Productions)

With The Real Thing
1995: Live (Real Records)
1997: Pleasure Is An Attitude (Real Records)
2011: Back on Track (Real Records)

With Sandvika Storband
1999: Lining Up! (SS Records)

With Ola Kvernberg
2001: Violin (Hot Club Records)

With Paul Wagnberg Trio
1999: Eat Meat (Real Records)
2001: Gone Fishing (Real Records)

With Anders Aarum Trio
2001: The Lucky Strike (Hot Club Records)

With Magnolia Jazzband
2002: In that Sweet Old Garden of Eden (MJB Recordings)

With Norbert Susemihl
2011: Norbert Susemihl's Joyful Gumbo – New Orleans Reflections (Sumi Records)
2014: Norbert Susemihl – A Tribute to the Louis Armstrong All Stars – Live at Maribo Jazzfestival'' (Sumi Records)

References

External links 

Biography at Jazzbasen
Discography at Jazzbasen

20th-century Norwegian drummers
21st-century Norwegian drummers
Norwegian jazz drummers
Male drummers
Norwegian jazz composers
1966 births
Living people
Musicians from Oslo
University of Oslo alumni
Norwegian expatriates in Denmark
20th-century drummers
Male jazz composers
20th-century Norwegian male musicians
21st-century Norwegian male musicians
The Real Thing (Norwegian band) members